Roughmussel is a neighbourhood in the Scottish city of Glasgow. It is situated south of the River Clyde near to the city boundaries with East Renfrewshire to the south and Renfrewshire to the west.

Named after a farm near Hurlet, it was developed as a small isolated council estate off Crookston Road, later extended towards Pollok with a few streets of private homes, between the 1950s and the 1970s. Since the expansion of Crookston southwards along the main road to meet Roughmussel in the early 21st century, the area is often simply referred to as Crookston. 

Barrhead Road, the other main thoroughfare in the area, features a row of local shops. Househill Park is to the south, through which the Levern Water flows, and another park with children's play area to the north-west adjoining new (2010s) housing at Raeswood. The land to the west of Roughmussel towards Paisley remains open green belt countryside and woodland. 

Areas of Glasgow